Mississippi Delta National Heritage Area is a federally designated National Heritage Area that seeks to preserve and promote the landscape, culture and history of the Mississippi Delta in the northwestern portion of the U.S. state of Mississippi. The region is famous for blues music and a unique culture that has had broad influence on  music and literature, both in the United States and worldwide.

The national heritage area comprises Bolivar, Carroll, Coahoma, Desoto, Holmes, Humphreys, Issaquena, Leflore, Panola, Quitman, Sharkey, Tallahatchie, Tate, Tunica, Warren, Washington and Yazoo counties.

Mississippi Delta National Heritage Area was established by the Omnibus Public Land Management Act of 2009. A management and development plan is being developed.

References

External links
 Mississippi Delta National Heritage Area site at Delta State University

National Heritage Areas of the United States
2009 establishments in Mississippi
Protected areas established in 2009
Protected areas of Bolivar County, Mississippi
Protected areas of Carroll County, Mississippi
Protected areas of Coahoma County, Mississippi
Protected areas of DeSoto County, Mississippi
Protected areas of Holmes County, Mississippi
Protected areas of Humphreys County, Mississippi
Protected areas of Issaquena County, Mississippi
Protected areas of Leflore County, Mississippi
Protected areas of Panola County, Mississippi
Protected areas of Quitman County, Mississippi
Protected areas of Sharkey County, Mississippi
Protected areas of Tallahatchie County, Mississippi
Protected areas of Tate County, Mississippi
Protected areas of Tunica County, Mississippi
Protected areas of Warren County, Mississippi
Protected areas of Washington County, Mississippi
Protected areas of Yazoo County, Mississippi